William Pettit may refer to:

William B. Pettit, American attorney
William H. Pettit, New Zealand missionary